Shayne Francis Lavery (born 8 December 1998) is a Northern Irish professional footballer who plays as a striker for Blackpool and the Northern Ireland national team. He has previously played for Everton, Falkirk and Linfield.

Early and personal life
Lavery attended St Michael's Grammar School in Lurgan. His older brother Conor played youth football for Manchester United.

Club career
Lavery played youth football for Oxford Sunnyside, Portadown and Glenavon. He was an unused substitute for Glenavon's first team in December 2014.

In March 2015, Lavery moved to Everton following a successful trial. On 6 December 2017, Lavery was named in Everton's first team squad for the Europa League match away to Apollon Limassol but was an unused substitute.

Lavery moved on loan to Scottish Championship club Falkirk in January 2019. Following the end of his loan, Lavery departed Everton at the end of the 2018–19 season.

On 31 May 2019, it was announced that Lavery had joined Linfield on a one-year deal. His deal was then extended by another year in May 2020.

Lavery signed for Blackpool on 1 July 2021 on a two-year contract, with an option of a further 12 months. He scored, deep into injury time, on his debut as a second-half substitute in a 1–1 draw at Bristol City on 7 August.

International career
Lavery played for Northern Ireland at under-17, under-19 and under-21 youth levels.

He received his first call up to the Northern Ireland senior team in March 2018, and made his senior debut against Panama in May 2018.

Lavery's first international goal came on 2 September 2021 against Lithuania in Vilnius, in a 2022 World Cup qualifier that Northern Ireland went on to win 4-1.

Career statistics

Club

International

Scores and results list Northern Ireland's goal tally first, score column indicates score after each Lavery goal.

References

External links

1998 births
Living people
Association footballers from Northern Ireland
Northern Ireland youth international footballers
Northern Ireland under-21 international footballers
Northern Ireland international footballers
Oxford Sunnyside F.C. players
Portadown F.C. players
Glenavon F.C. players
Everton F.C. players
Association football forwards
People from Lurgan
Falkirk F.C. players
Linfield F.C. players
Blackpool F.C. players
Scottish Professional Football League players